Gian Singh  (5 October 19206 October 1996) was a recipient of the Victoria Cross, the highest and most prestigious award for gallantry in the face of the enemy that can be awarded to British and Commonwealth forces.

Biography
Singh was born into a Jat Sikh family in Sahabpur, a village in the Nawanshahr district (now, Shaheed Bhagat Singh Nagar district) of eastern Punjab.  He was 24 years old, and a Naik in the 15th Punjab Regiment in the British Indian Army, when during the Burma Campaign 1944–45 of World War II he performed the deeds for which he was awarded the VC. The citation reads:

Refusing to be invalided from the Army, Singh received a mention in dispatches later that year. He was presented with his Victoria Cross by King George VI, in a ceremony at Buckingham Palace on 16 October 1945.

After Indian independence in 1947, Singh transferred to the 11th Sikhs when 15 Punjab was allocated to Pakistan. He was promoted to havildar (sergeant), with successive promotions to jemadar (now naib subedar in the Indian Army) on 29 December 1955, followed by promotion to subedar on 21 December 1961. He saw action in both the 1962 Sino-Indian War and in the Indo-Pakistani War of 1965. Promoted to subedar major on 15 June 1967, Singh retired from the army in August 1969 with the honorary rank of captain. He died in 1996.

Awards

References

External links
We were there  – Naik Gian Singh VC
Obituary: Gian Singh VC
Burial location

Sikh warriors
Punjabi people
Indian World War II recipients of the Victoria Cross
British Indian Army soldiers
1920 births
1996 deaths
People from Shaheed Bhagat Singh Nagar district
Indian Army personnel
Recipients of the Param Vishisht Seva Medal